Bhushan Lal Karihaloo, FIEAus MASME FASCE (born September 1943, Srinagar, Kashmir), is a professor of civil, architectural, and environmental engineering. He is head of the Institute of Theoretical, Applied and Computational Mechanics at Cardiff University and an expert on fracture mechanics. In 2006 he was awarded the European Structural Integrity Society's Griffith Medal for "his outstanding research in the field of theoretical fracture mechanics and fracture of quasi-brittle materials, in particular of concrete, fibre-reinforced cementitious composites, and advanced tough ceramics".

Books
Fracture Mechanics and Structural Concrete, Longman, 1995

References

External links
Official website

Living people
1943 births
People from Srinagar
British civil engineers
Academics of Cardiff University